Wake Village is a city in Bowie County, Texas, United States, and a suburb of Texarkana, Texas. It is part of the Texarkana metropolitan area. The population was 5,945 at the 2020 census.

History

Wake Village was founded in 1944 for the war effort to provide housing for the plant workers at the Red River Army Depot and the Lone Star Army Ammunition Plant.

The name came from Wake Island in the Pacific theater of the war. The population was over 1,000 in the early 1950s; in the early 1990s it had reached 4,400, and the 2000 census reported 5,129. The sections of Wake Village in which the original post-war homes exist are named WWII-related names, i.e. Manila, Guam, Singapore, Arizona, Burma Victory, etc.  The 1950s mid-century modern home enclaves feature names such as Esther and Marianna.

Geography

Wake Village is located in eastern Bowie County at  (33.425701, –94.111716), immediately west of Texarkana, at the intersection of Farm to Market Road 989 and Old Redwater Road, north of U.S. Route 67 and south of U.S. Route 82. The city of Nash is situated immediately to the north, also along FM 989.

Demographics

As of the 2020 United States census, there were 5,945 people, 2,185 households, and 1,478 families residing in the city.

As of the census of 2000, there were 5,129 people, 2,042 households, and 1,511 families residing in the city. The racial makeup of the city was 82.76% White, 14.19% African American, 0.92% Native American, 0.47% Asian, 0.04% Pacific Islander, 0.96% from other races, and 0.66% from two or more races. Hispanic or Latino of any race were 3.18% of the population.

There were 2,042 households, out of which 34.4% had children under the age of 18 living with them, 58.7% were married couples living together, 12.1% had a female householder with no husband present, and 26.0% were non-families. 23.3% of all households were made up of individuals, and 8.2% had someone living alone who was 65 years of age or older. The average household size was 2.51 and the average family size was 2.94.

In the city, the population was spread out, with 25.8% under the age of 18, 8.4% from 18 to 24, 30.0% from 25 to 44, 22.7% from 45 to 64, and 13.0% who were 65 years of age or older. The median age was 36 years. For every 100 females, there were 90.7 males. For every 100 females age 18 and over, there were 87.3 males.

The median income for a household in the city was $39,961, and the median income for a family was $47,474. Males had a median income of $32,486 versus $20,648 for females. The per capita income for the city was $18,447. About 8.3% of families and 12.2% of the population were below the poverty line, including 19.8% of those under age 18 and 10.1% of those age 65 or over.

References

External links
City of Wake Village official website

Cities in Bowie County, Texas
Cities in Texas
Texarkana
Cities in Texarkana metropolitan area